Legionella cardiaca is a Gram-negative, non-spore-forming, aerobic, rod-shaped bacterium from the genus Legionella. It was isolated from the aortic valve of a patient with endocarditis.

References

External links
Type strain of Legionella cardiaca at BacDive -  the Bacterial Diversity Metadatabase

Bacteria described in 2012
Legionellales